was an  deployed by Japan against the United States during World War II.

Between November 1944 and April 1945, the Imperial Japanese Army launched about 9,300 balloons from sites on Honshu, of which about 300 were found or observed in the U.S. and Canada, with some in Mexico. The balloons were carried by high-altitude and high-speed currents over the Pacific Ocean, now known as the jet stream, and used a sophisticated ballast system to maintain altitude. The bombs were ineffective as fire starters due to damp conditions, causing only minor damage and six deaths in a single civilian incident in Oregon in May 1945. The Fu-Go balloon was the first weapon system with intercontinental range, with its attacks being the longest-ranged in the history of warfare at the time.

Background 

The balloon bomb concept was developed by the Imperial Japanese Army's Number Nine Research Laboratory (also known as the Noborito Laboratory), founded in 1927. The project was stopped by 1935 and never completed.

After the Doolittle Raid in April 1942, in which American planes bombed the Japanese mainland, the Imperial General Headquarters directed Noborito to develop a retaliatory bombing capability against the U.S. In summer 1942, Noborito investigated several proposals, including long-range bombers that could make one-way sorties from Japan to cities on the U.S. West Coast, and small bomb-laden seaplanes that could be launched from submarines. On September 9, 1942, the latter was tested in the Lookout Air Raid, in which a Yokosuka E14Y seaplane was launched from a submarine off the Oregon coast. Warrant Officer Nobuo Fujita dropped two large incendiary bombs in Siskiyou National Forest in the hopes of starting a forest fire and safely returned to the submarine; however, response crews spotted the plane and contained the small blazes. The program was cancelled by the Navy.

Also in September 1942, Major General Sueki Kusaba, who had served under Tada in the original balloon bomb program in the 1930s, was assigned to the laboratory and revived the Fu-Go project with a focus on longer flights. The Oregon air raid, while not achieving its strategic objective, had demonstrated the potential of using unmanned balloons at a low cost to ignite large-scale forest fires. According to U.S. interviews with Japanese officials after the war, the balloon bomb campaign was undertaken "almost exclusively for home propaganda purposes", with the Army having little expectation of effectiveness.

Design and development 

The balloons were constructed from four to five thin layers of washi, a durable paper derived from the paper mulberry (kōzo) bush, which were glued together with konnyaku (Japanese potato) paste. The Army mobilized thousands of teenage girls at high schools across the country to laminate and glue the sheets together, with final assembly and inflation tests at large indoor arenas including the Nichigeki Music Hall and Ryōgoku Kokugikan sumo hall in Tokyo. A calibrated timer would release a  incendiary bomb at the end of the flight. Two submarines (I-34 and I-35) were prepared and two hundred balloons were produced by August 1943, but attack missions were postponed due to the need for submarines as weapons and food transports.

Engineers next investigated the feasibility of balloon launches against the United States from the Japanese mainland, a distance of at least . Engineers sought to make use of strong seasonal air currents discovered flowing from west to east at high altitude and speed over Japan, now known as the jet stream. The currents had been investigated by Japanese scientist Wasaburo Oishi in the 1920s; in late 1943, the Army consulted Hidetoshi Arakawa of the Central Meteorological Observatory, who used Oishi's data to extrapolate the air currents across the Pacific Ocean and estimate that a balloon released in winter and that maintained an altitude of  could reach the North American continent in 30 to 100 hours. Arakawa further found that the strongest winds blew from November to March at speeds approaching .

Changing pressure levels in a fixed-volume balloon posed technical challenges. During the day, heat from the sun increased pressure, risking the balloon rising above the air currents or bursting. A relief valve was added to allow gas to escape when the envelope's internal pressure rose above a set level. At night, cool temperatures risked the balloon falling below the currents, an issue that worsened as gas was released. To resolve this, engineers developed a sophisticated ballast system with 32 sandbags mounted around a cast aluminum wheel, with each sandbag connected to gunpowder blowout plugs. A separate altimeter set between  controlled the later release of the bombs. A one-hour activating fuse for the altimeters was ignited at launch, allowing the balloon time to ascend above these two thresholds. Tests of the design in August 1944 indicated success, with several balloons releasing radiosonde signals for up to 80 hours (the maximum time allowed by the batteries). A self-destruct system was added; a three-minute fuse triggered by the release of the last bomb would detonate a block of picric acid and destroy the carriage, followed by an 82-minute fuse that would ignite the hydrogen and destroy the envelope.

In late 1942, the Imperial General Headquarters had directed the Navy to begin its own balloon bomb program in parallel with the Army project. Lieutenant Commander Kiyoshi Tanaka headed an group that developed a  rubberized silk balloon, designated the B-Type (in contrast to the Army's A-Type). The silk material was an effort to create a flexible envelope that could withstand pressure changes. The design was tested in August 1944, but the balloons burst immediately after reaching altitude, determined to be the result of faulty rubberized seams. The Navy program was subsequently consolidated under Army control, due in part to the declining availability of rubber as the war continued. The B-Type balloons were later equipped with a version of the A-Type's ballast system and tested on November 2, 1944; one of these balloons, which was not loaded with bombs, became the first to be recovered by Americans after being spotted in the water off San Pedro, California, on November 4.

The bombs carried most commonly were:

 or alternatively to the anti-personnel bomb, one Type 97  incendiary bomb, containing three magnesium containers of thermite.

Offensive and defenses

A balloon launch organization of three battalions was formed. The first battalion included headquarters and three squadrons totaling 1,500 men in Ibaraki Prefecture with nine launch stations at Ōtsu. The second battalion of 700 men in three squadrons operated six launch stations at Ichinomiya, Chiba; and the third battalion of 600 men in two squadrons operated six launch stations at Nakoso, Fukushima. The Ōtsu site featured its own hydrogen plant, while the second and third battalions used hydrogen gas manufactured at factories near Tokyo. The combined launching capacity of the sites was about 200 balloons per day, with 15,000 launches planned through March. The Army estimated that 10 percent of the balloons would survive the journey across the Pacific Ocean.

Each launch pad consisted of anchor screws drilled into the ground and arranged in a circle the same diameter as the balloons. After laying out a deflated envelope, hoses were used to fill the envelope with hydrogen before it was tied down with guide ropes and detached from the anchors. The carriage was attached and the guide ropes were disconnected. Each launch took between thirty minutes and an hour, depending on the presence of surface winds that made releases difficult. The best time to launch was just after the passing of a high-pressure front, and wind conditions were most suitable for several hours prior to the onshore breezes at sunrise. Suitable launch conditions were expected for only about fifty days through the winter period of maximum jet stream velocity.

The first balloons were launched at 0500 on November 3, 1944. Some balloons in each of the launches carried radiosonde equipment instead of bombs, and were tracked by direction finding stations in Ichinomiya, at Iwanuma, Miyagi, at Misawa, Aomori, and on Sakhalin to estimate the progress of the balloons towards North America.

Two weeks after the discovery of the B-Type balloon off San Pedro, an A-Type balloon was found in the ocean off Kailua, Hawaii, on November 14. More appeared near Thermopolis, Wyoming, on December 6 (with an explosion heard by witnesses, and a crater later located) and near Kalispell, Montana, on December 11, followed by finds near Marshall, Alaska, and Estacada, Oregon, later in the month. National and state agencies were placed on heightened alert, and forest rangers were asked to report sightings or finds. The balloons continued to be discovered across North America on a near daily basis, with sightings and partial or full recoveries in Alaska, Arizona, California, Colorado, Idaho, Iowa, Kansas, Michigan (where the easternmost of the balloons was found at Farmington), Montana, Nebraska, Nevada, North Dakota, Oregon, South Dakota, Texas, Utah, Washington, and Wyoming; as well as in Canada in Alberta, British Columbia, Manitoba, Saskatchewan, and the Northwest and Yukon Territories; in northwestern Mexico; and at sea by passing ships.

American authorities concluded the greatest danger from the balloons would be wildfires in the coastal forests of the Pacific Northwest during dry months. The Fourth Air Force, Western Defense Command, and Ninth Service Command organized the "Firefly Project" with a number of Stinson L-5 Sentinel and Douglas C-47 Skytrain aircraft and 2,700 troops, including 200 paratroopers of the 555th Parachute Infantry Battalion, who were stationed at critical points for use in firefighting missions. Through Firefly, the military used the United States Forest Service as a proxy, unifying fire suppression communications among federal and state agencies and modernizing the Forest Service through the influx of military personnel, equipment, and tactics. In the "Lightning Project", health and agricultural officers, veterinarians, and 4-H clubs were instructed to report any strange new diseases of crops or livestock caused by potential biological warfare. Stocks of decontamination chemicals, ultimately unused, were shipped to key points in the western states. A report by U.S. investigators, based on interviews with Imperial Army officials after the war, concluded that there had been no plans for chemical or biological payloads.

Army Air Forces and Navy fighters were scrambled on several occasions to intercept balloons, but they had little success due to inaccurate sighting reports, bad weather, and the high altitude at which the balloons traveled. In all, about 20 of the balloons were shot down by aircraft. Experiments conducted on recovered balloons to determine their radar reflectivity also had little success. In the "Sunset Project" initiated in early April 1945, the Fourth Air Force attempted to detect the radio transmissions emitted by tracking balloons using sites in coastal Washington; 95 suspected signals were detected, but were of little use for interception due to the relatively low percentage of balloons with transmitters, and observed fading of the signals as they approached the coast.

Few American officials believed at first that the balloons could have come directly from Japan. Early U.S. theories speculated that they were launched from German prisoner of war camps or from Japanese-American internment centers. After bombs of Japanese origin were found, it was believed that the balloons were launched from coastal submarines. Statistical analysis of valve serial numbers suggested that tens of thousands of balloons had been produced. Sand from the sandbags was studied by the Military Geology Unit of the United States Geological Survey, revealing mineral and diatom compositions that corresponded to Ichinomiya. Aerial reconnaissance later located two nearby hydrogen production facilities, which were destroyed by B-29 bombing raids in April 1945.

Censorship campaign
On January 4, 1945, the U.S. Office of Censorship sent a confidential memo to newspaper editors and radio broadcasters asking that they give no publicity to balloon incidents; this proved highly effective, with the agency sending another memo three months later stating that cooperation had been "excellent" and that "there is no question that your refusal to publish or broadcast information about these balloons has baffled the Japanese, annoyed and hindered them, and has been an important contribution to security." The Imperial Army only ever learned of the balloon at Kalispell, from an article in the Chinese newspaper Ta Kung Pao on December 18, 1944. The Kalispell find was originally reported on December 14 by the Western News, a weekly published in Libby, Montana; the story later appeared in articles in the January 1, 1945, editions of Time and Newsweek magazines, as well as on the front page of the January 2 edition of The Oregonian of Portland, Oregon, before the Office of Censorship sent the memo. Starting in February 1945, Japanese propaganda broadcasts falsely announced numerous fires and an alarmed American public, further declaring casualties in the hundreds to thousands.

One breach occurred in late February, when Congressman Arthur L. Miller mentioned the balloons in a weekly column he sent to all 91 newspapers in his Nebraska district. The Gordon Journal published the column, which said in part, "As a final act of desperation, it is believed that the Japs may release fire balloons aimed at our great forests in the northwest". In response, intelligence officers of the Seventh Service Command in Omaha called editors at all 91 papers, requesting censorship; this was largely successful, with only two papers printing Miller's column. On April 22, officers investigated the nationally-syndicated comic strip Tim Tyler's Luck, which depicted a Japanese balloon being recovered by the crew of an American submarine. In subsequent weeks, the strip's storyline saw the protagonists fight monster vines that sprang from seeds the balloon was carrying, created by an evil Japanese horticulturalist. Another source of concern was the comic strip The Adventures of Smilin' Jack, which a few weeks later depicted a plane crashing into a Japanese balloon that exploded and started a fire upon falling to the ground. In both cases, the Office of Censorship deemed it unnecessary to censor the comic strips.

In late March, the United Press (UP) wrote a detailed story on the balloons intended for its distributors across the country. This prompted Army officers to contact military intelligence, commenting that the reporting included "a lot of mechanical detail on the thing, in addition to being a hell of a scare story". Censors contacted the UP, which replied that the story had not yet been teletyped, and that only five copies of it existed; censors were able to retrieve and destroy the copies. Investigators later determined the origin of the story was a discussion held in an open session of the Colorado General Assembly.

Abandonment and results 

By mid-April 1945, Japan lacked the resources to continue manufacturing balloons, with both paper and hydrogen in short supply. Furthermore, the Army had little evidence that the balloons were reaching North America, let alone causing damage. The campaign was halted, with no intention to revive it when winds restarted in late 1945. In total, about 9,300 balloons were launched in the campaign (approximately 700 in November 1944, 1,200 in December, 2,000 in January 1945, 2,500 in February, 2,500 in March, and 400 in April), of which about 300 were found or observed in North America. The Fu-Go balloon was the first weapon system to have intercontinental range, with its flights being the longest-ranged attacks in the history of warfare at the time.

No wildfires were positively identified as being caused by balloon bombs. As predicted by Imperial Army officials, the winter and spring launch dates had limited the chances of the incendiary bombs starting forest fires due to the high levels of precipitation in the Pacific Northwest; forests were generally snow-covered or too damp to catch fire easily. Furthermore, much of the western U.S. received disproportionately more precipitation in 1945 than in any other year in the decade, with some areas receiving  of precipitation more than normal. Many of the recovered balloons also had a high percentage of unexploded plugs, caused by failure of their batteries or fuses. The most tactically successful attack took place on March 10, 1945, when one of the balloons descended near Toppenish, Washington, colliding with power lines and causing a short circuit that cut off power to the Manhattan Project's production facility at the state's Hanford Engineer Works. Backup devices restored power to the site, but it took three days for its nuclear reactors to be brought to full capacity; the plutonium produced in the reactors was later used in Fat Man, the atomic bomb dropped on Nagasaki in August 1945.

Single lethal attack 

On May 5, 1945, six civilians were killed near Bly, Oregon, when they discovered one of the balloon bombs in Fremont National Forest, becoming the only fatalities from Axis action in the continental U.S. during the war.

Reverend Archie Mitchell and his pregnant wife Elsie (age 26) drove up Gearhart Mountain that day with five of their Sunday school students for a picnic. While Archie was moving the car, Elsie and the children found the balloon and carriage, loaded with an anti-personnel bomb, on the ground. A large explosion occurred; the four boys (Edward Engen, 13; Jay Gifford, 13; Dick Patzke, 14; and Sherman Shoemaker, 11) were killed instantly, while Joan Patzke (13) and Elsie died shortly afterwards. A bomb disposal expert guessed that the bomb had been kicked or otherwise disturbed. Military personnel who arrived on the scene observed that the balloon had snow beneath it, unlike the surrounding area, and concluded that it had lain there undisturbed for weeks until discovered. The U.S. press blackout was lifted on May 22 so the public could be warned of the balloon threat.

A memorial, the Mitchell Monument, was built in 1950 at the site of the explosion. The surrounding Mitchell Recreation Area was listed on the National Register of Historic Places in 2003. A nearby ponderosa pine still bears scars on its trunk from the bomb's shrapnel. In 1987, a group of Japanese women who were involved in Fu-Go production as schoolgirls delivered 1,000 paper cranes to the families of the victims as a symbol of peace and forgiveness, and cherry trees were planted around the monument on the fiftieth anniversary of the incident in 1995.

After World War II

The remains of balloons have continued to be discovered after the war. At least eight were found in the 1940s, three in the 1950s, two in the 1960s, and one in the 1970s. A carriage with a live bomb was found near Lumby, British Columbia, in 2014 and detonated by a Royal Canadian Navy ordnance disposal team. Remains of another balloon were found near McBride, British Columbia, in 2019. Many war museums in the U.S. and Canada exhibit Fu-Go fragments, including the National Air and Space Museum and Canadian War Museum.

See also
 Operation Outward – WWII British attack on Germany with balloon bombs
 E77 balloon bomb – 1950s U.S. biological weapon inspired by Fu-Go
 WS-124A Flying Cloud – 1950s U.S. Air Force balloon bomb program
 2023 Chinese balloon incident – Incursion of U.S. airspace by an alleged spy balloon

Notes

References

Works cited

Further reading

External links

Report by U.S. Technical Air Intelligence Center, May 1945

Incendiary weapons
World War II weapons of Japan
Balloons (aeronautics)
American Theater of World War II
Balloon weaponry
Japanese inventions
Weapons and ammunition introduced in 1944